The Bitter Truth is the fifth studio album by American rock band Evanescence. It was released on March 26, 2021, through BMG Rights Management and was produced by Nick Raskulinecz. It is the band's first album of all-new material since their 2011 self-titled third album.  The Bitter Truth received a positive critical reception. It reached number 11 on the US Billboard 200, top five on the Billboard Independent, Alternative, Hard Rock, and Rock Albums charts, and the top 10 of multiple international album charts.

Background and recording
Lead vocalist Amy Lee first spoke about a new studio album for the band in July 2018. In an interview with Detroit radio station WRIF, Lee confirmed that the band planned to work on a new album following the end of their tour in support of Synthesis.

In an interview with Sirius XM backstage at Epicenter Festival at Rockingham Speedway in May 2019, Lee again confirmed that a new album was in the works. Blabbermouth.net reported that Lee was hoping the album would be ready for release in 2020. "We're just gonna get together and see what happens this month," she said, "and start doing that more regularly until we feel like we're ready to do it."

Lee then provided an update on the album in November 2019, while taking part in a Reddit AMA. Responding to a question pertaining to new music from the band, Lee commented that she was "absolutely living in it" and was "listen[ing] to our new music every day."

The band entered the studio in January 2020 with Nick Raskulinecz, with whom they had previously worked on 2011's Evanescence. Although originally planning to work with several producers across the album, the band's plans changed due to the COVID-19 pandemic. This then turned Raskulinecz into The Bitter Truths sole producer. In August, the U.S.-based band members returned into the studio to finish writing and recording after taking COVID tests, and German guitarist Jen Majura had to work remotely. On September 9, the album was nearing completion, with "70% done". Recording was completed in November.

The album was announced in April 2020, and was originally planned for release in late 2020. The pandemic delayed the album's completion, however, and eventually pushed it to a March 2021 release.

Lee talked about the core theme of the album:

Composition
The album is described as alternative metal, gothic metal, heavy metal, and hard rock.

Amy Lee disclosed the inspiration behind the new songs in a Marie Claire interview:

"Yeah Right", "Feeding the Dark", and "Take Cover", the latter previously debuted live in the 2016 live shows, were originally written for the 2011 self-titled album, but were reworked a decade later.

Release and promotion
The Bitter Truth was first announced with the release of its lead single, "Wasted on You", in April 2020. Its second single, "The Game Is Over", followed in July. The band released an additional two singles in August's "Use My Voice" and December's "Yeah Right" (as a promotional one). The former featured guest vocalists from bands such as Veridia, Within Temptation, The Pretty Reckless and Halestorm. The latter, meanwhile, was released to coincide with the announcement of the album's tracklist and release date. The fourth single, "Better Without You", was released on March 5, 2021.

To promote the album in advance, the band performed the first single "Wasted on You" at the Jimmy Kimmel Live! show on February 19, 2021. The band also toured Europe in 2022, in a co-headlining tour alongside Within Temptation.

Reception

Critical reception

The Bitter Truth received a positive critical reception. On Metacritic, which assigns a normalized rating out of 100 to reviews from mainstream critics, the album has a weighted average score of 78 based on eight reviews, indicating "generally favorable reviews". Dannii Leivers of Metal Hammer deemed the album "darkly emotional, empowering and politically charged", which is "nestled between the bold and the familiar" and has "some surprises up its sleeve". Writing for Rolling Stone, Jon Dola complimented Lee's songwriting and her ability to "sound intimate and revealing even when the music engulfs her in a maelstrom", calling the album a "take-no-prisoners battle for redemption" that bares "life's battle scars". In Renowned for Sound, Mike Corner said the record "remains satisfyingly heavy throughout", and in combination with Lee's vocals it reminds how deftly Evanescence can "harness the power of heavy rock music".

Josh Weiner from Atwood Magazine praised the album's energy, instrumental work, emotional range and uplifting theme of perseverance, concluding that "Evanescence prove that they're still a hugely compelling act" and "all of the band's positive virtues have endured". Entertainment Weekly writer Sydney Bucksbaum said Lee's voice "has never sounded more passionate than it does on The Bitter Truth". Neil McCormick of The Daily Telegraph felt that the mature tone and sharp lyrics "make up for an old-fashioned sound". For Gigwise, Vicky Greer regarded the album a "bold show of emotions that occasionally gets lost in translation" as the "vocals and lyrics are somewhat lost in production, lacking a certain emphasis – if you don’t listen at maximum volume, you might miss out on some of the finer details of the album." Los Angeles Timess Suzy Exposito said Lee wrote "her fiercest songs to date" and "Evanescence continues to own the space where frosty electronic currents collide with volcanic surges of metal catharsis and coagulate into hard rock candy". The Bitter Truth is a "beast of many moods" endowed with "stellar" musicianship and vocals, Garry Bushell reviewed in Daily Express.  Danielle Chelosky wrote in Spin that Lee's strength "is clearer than ever, and she's reclaiming even more this time", while the "reckoning and pain" of experiences permeates the album with "vivid imagery", vulnerability and empowerment alongside a "bigger and bolder" sound. 

Kerrang!s Nick Ruskell said The Bitter Truth offers "comfort, catharsis and a new perspective", with Lee's contemplations looking outward as much as inward in forward-thinking notion alongside an "ever-expanding musical palette, still rooted in the vaguely gothy metal of old, but now with the heaviness taken further and punctuated with electronics and keyboards". Thomas Green of The Arts Desk considered the album "a sturdy testament to lead singer and band-boss Amy Lee's continuing surety of vision". Reviewing for Consequence, Claire Colette viewed the record as an "triumphant" return, "reminiscent of the band's older material but also entirely fresh", with the band's passion and energy "evident throughout" and Lee's "immense talent as a vocalist and songwriter consistently shining through". The album was deemed "emotionally charged" by Scott Mervis of Pittsburgh Post-Gazette, and "dynamic" by Chicago Sun-Times writer Selena Fragassi. Neil Z. Yeung of AllMusic called it "one of the band's most engaging works, balancing sonic power with Lee's inimitable vocals and songwriting", and carrying listeners "on a journey both familiar and fresh ... pushing Evanescence into the future with a graceful maturity and worldly perspective." Revolver called The Bitter Truth a "triumphant statement of perseverance, with Lee seizing her role as alt-metal elder stateswoman for some of the hardest hitting songs of her career."

Accolades

Track listing

Personnel
Credits adapted from the liner notes of The Bitter Truth.

Evanescence
 Amy Lee – lead vocals, piano, keyboards, additional programming
 Troy McLawhorn – guitar
 Jen Majura – guitar, backing vocals
 Tim McCord – bass
 Will Hunt – drums

Additional musicians
 David Campbell – string arrangements
 Alan Umstead – strings contractor, concertmaster
 Nashville Music Scoring – orchestra
 Lzzy Hale – backing vocals (track 8)
 Taylor Momsen – backing vocals (track 8)
 Deena Jakoub – backing vocals (track 8)
 Lindsey Stirling – backing vocals (track 8)
 Sharon den Adel – backing vocals (track 8)
 Lori Lee – backing vocals (track 8)
 Carrie Lee – backing vocals (track 8)
 Amy McLawhorn – backing vocals (track 8)

Additional personnel
 Nick Raskulinecz – production, mixing, recording
 Nathan Yarborough – engineering
 Logan Greeson – assistant engineering
 Nick Spezia – strings engineering
 Ted Jensen – mastering
 Tiago Nuñez – programming (tracks 2–11)
 Will B. Hunt – additional programming
 Chris Vrenna – additional programming (track 10)
 Scott Kirkland – programming production (track 1)
 Josh Hartzler – cover photo
 P.R. Brown – album design, photography
 Nick Fancher – photography

Charts

Weekly charts

Year-end charts

Release history

References

2021 albums
Evanescence albums
Albums produced by Nick Raskulinecz
Albums impacted by the COVID-19 pandemic
Albums postponed due to the COVID-19 pandemic
Gothic metal albums by American artists